The voiceless bidental fricative is a rare consonantal sound.
People with hypoglossia (abnormally small tongue) may use it for target .

Features 

Features of the voiceless bidental fricative:

 Its place of articulation is bidental, which means it is articulated with the lower and upper teeth pressed together.

Occurrence

See also 
 List of phonetics topics

References

Bidental consonants
Fricative consonants
Voiceless oral consonants
Pulmonic consonants